Republic of Cyprus competed at the 2012 Summer Olympics in London, United Kingdom  from 27 July to 12 August 2012. This was the nation's ninth consecutive appearance at the Olympics.

Cyprus Olympic Committee sent the nation's smallest team ever to the Games since 1988. A total of 13 athletes, 9 men and 4 women, competed in 7 sports. Skeet shooter Georgios Achilleos became the first Cypriot athlete to participate in four Olympic games. Professional tennis player and one-time Australian Open finalist Marcos Baghdatis, who did not compete in Beijing because of injury, was the nation's flag bearer at the opening ceremony.

Cyprus left London with its first ever Olympic medal by sailor Pavlos Kontides, who won silver in the men's Laser event.

Medalists

Athletics

Cypriot athletes have so far achieved qualifying standards in the following athletics events (up to a maximum of 3 athletes in each event at the 'A' Standard, and 1 at the 'B' Standard):

Men

Women

Cycling

Cyprus has qualified the following cyclists for the Games.

Mountain biking

Gymnastics

Rhythmic

Sailing

Cyprus has qualified 1 boat for each of the following events

Men

M = Medal race; EL = Eliminated – did not advance into the medal race;

Shooting

Cyprus has qualified for three quota places in shooting;

Men

Women

Swimming

Swimmers have so far achieved qualifying standards in the following events (up to a maximum of 2 swimmers in each event at the Olympic Qualifying Time (OQT), and potentially 1 at the Olympic Selection Time (OST)):

Women

Tennis

References

Nations at the 2012 Summer Olympics
2012
2012 in Cypriot sport